In Greek mythology, Telete (Ancient Greek: Τελετή means 'consecration') was the daughter of Dionysus and Nicaea, naiad daughter of the river-god Sangarius and Cybele.

Mythology 
Concerning Telete's birth, it is related that Nicaea was ashamed of having been made pregnant by Dionysus, and even attempted to hang herself; nevertheless, in due time a daughter was born to her. The Horae were said to have served as midwives at Telete's birth. Telete was destined by Dionysus to become a follower of himself and his son Iacchus, her half-brother.

Pausanias mentions a statue of Telete in the sanctuary of the Heliconian Muses in Boeotia. Her image was next to that of Orpheus.

Telete was associated with nighttime festivities and ritual dances in honor of Dionysus, and has been interpreted as a goddess of initiation into the Bacchic rites.

Notes

References 

 Nonnus of Panopolis, Dionysiaca translated by William Henry Denham Rouse (1863-1950), from the Loeb Classical Library, Cambridge, MA, Harvard University Press, 1940.  Online version at the Topos Text Project.
 Nonnus of Panopolis, Dionysiaca. 3 Vols. W.H.D. Rouse. Cambridge, MA., Harvard University Press; London, William Heinemann, Ltd. 1940-1942. Greek text available at the Perseus Digital Library.
 Pausanias, Description of Greece with an English Translation by W.H.S. Jones, Litt.D., and H.A. Ormerod, M.A., in 4 Volumes. Cambridge, MA, Harvard University Press; London, William Heinemann Ltd. 1918. . Online version at the Perseus Digital Library
 Pausanias, Graeciae Descriptio. 3 vols. Leipzig, Teubner. 1903.  Greek text available at the Perseus Digital Library.
 Vollmer, Wilhelm. (1874). Wörterbuch der Mythologie. Stuttgart, p. 426.

Greek goddesses
Children of Dionysus
Cult of Dionysus